Love, Hate and Then There’s You is the third and final studio album by the American alternative rock band, The Von Bondies. It was released on February 3, 2009. It is their only album for Majordomo Records.

Track listing
All songs written by Jason Stollsteimer except where noted. 
"This Is Our Perfect Crime" - 2:57
"Shut Your Mouth" - 2:22
"Pale Bride" - 2:55
"Only to Haunt You" - 3:13  	
"21st Birthday" - 3:18
"She's Dead to Me" - 1:24
"Chancer" - 3:35
"Blame Game" (Blum, Stollsteimer) - 2:53
"I Don't Wanna" - 2:36
"Accidents Will Happen" - 2:45
"Earthquake" (Blum, Stollsteimer) - 3:04
"Modern Saints" - 4:31

References

2009 albums
The Von Bondies albums
Albums produced by Butch Walker